Frozen Run is a tributary of Hemlock Creek in Columbia County, Pennsylvania, in the United States. The stream flows through Frosty Valley and is also near a fault. It is designated as a coldwater fishery. Parts of the watershed are impaired due to siltation. The stream has several unnamed tributaries.

A. Joseph Armstrong describes Frozen Run as "pretty mundane" in his book Trout Unlimited's Guide to Pennsylvania Limestone Streams.

Course
Frozen Run begins in a pond in Hemlock Township. It flows south in a valley for less than a mile before turning southeast, entering the much broader Frosty Valley. In Frosty Valley, the stream turns east and flows for a few miles before reaching its confluence with Hemlock Creek near the community of Buckhorn.

Tributaries
Frozen Run has a number of unnamed tributaries. These include UNT 65640513, UNT 65640565, UNT 65640671, and UNT 65640719.

Hydrology, geography, and geology
Parts of Frozen Run and several of its unnamed tributaries are considered by the Pennsylvania Department of Environmental Protection to be impaired by siltation due to agriculture.  of streams in the watershed are considered to be impaired.

Frozen Run mostly flows through rock of the Mahantango Formation. However, parts of the stream are over rock of the Harrell Formation and the stream's upper reaches lie over rock of the Trimmers Rock Formation. The stream is in Frosty Valley and is located near the Lightstreet Fault.

Watershed
Areas that are hazardous during floods are largely undeveloped in the watershed of Frozen Run.

Name and etymology
Frozen Run is named for the fact that it is sometimes frozen. A 1997 book listed Frozen Run as one of the most interesting stream names in Pennsylvania.

Biology
Frozen Run has a large population of chubs. According to A. Joseph Armstrong, there may also be trout inhabiting the stream. Frozen Run is designated as a coldwater fishery.

There are forested seeps at the headwaters of Frozen Run. According to the Columbia County Natural Areas Inventory, these may contain "sensitive ecological features".

See also
List of tributaries of Fishing Creek (North Branch Susquehanna River)
West Hemlock Creek

References

Rivers of Columbia County, Pennsylvania
Tributaries of Fishing Creek (North Branch Susquehanna River)
Rivers of Pennsylvania